Gahlaut Rahul Singh (born 18 September 1995) is an Indian cricketer who plays for Services. 
He made his List A debut for Hyderabad in the 2012–13 Vijay Hazare Trophy on 14 February 2013. He made his Twenty20 debut for Hyderabad in the 2012–13 Inter State Twenty-20 Tournament on 22 March 2013. He made his first-class debut on 6 October 2016 for Services in the 2016–17 Ranji Trophy.

References

External links
 

1995 births
Living people
Indian cricketers
Services cricketers
Cricketers from Kolkata